Joe Sklar (1917 – 26 January 2008) was a Canadian weightlifter. He competed in the men's middleweight event at the 1948 Summer Olympics.

References

1917 births
2008 deaths
Canadian male weightlifters
Olympic weightlifters of Canada
Weightlifters at the 1948 Summer Olympics
Place of birth missing
20th-century Canadian people
21st-century Canadian people